Armstrong Township is the name of some places in the U.S. state of Pennsylvania:
Armstrong Township, Indiana County, Pennsylvania
Armstrong Township, Lycoming County, Pennsylvania

Pennsylvania township disambiguation pages